Ujalpur is a village and post office in Kutubpur union in Meherpur Sadar Upazila of Meherpur, Khulna, Bangladesh. It is the birthplace of Bangladeshi cricketer Imrul Kayes.

Geography 
It has 1170 households and total area . Ujalpur is bounded by Meherpur town and Kalachandpur on the south, Manoharpur on the north, Jhaubaria and Subidpur on the east, Fatehpur and West Bengal (India) on the west. It is situated on the bank of Bhairab river.

Demographics 
 Bangladesh census Ujalpur had a population of 4,548. Males constitute 49.95% of the population and females 50.05%. Ujalpur has an average literacy rate of 49.5%, male literacy is 50.6%, and female literacy is 48.3%. In Ujalpur, 18% of the population is under 9 years of age.

References 

Villages in Meherpur District